The Promise is a 2010 play written by Ben Brown. It premiered on 17 February at the Orange Tree Theater in Richmond-upon-Thames and production wrapped up on 20 March 2010. It is set in early World War I and deals with the lead-up to the Balfour Declaration, via the relationship between Herbert Samuel, Edwin Samuel Montagu, and H. H. Asquith's confidante Venetia Stanley.

External links
Official site

Reviews
http://www.telegraph.co.uk/culture/theatre/theatre-reviews/7325440/The-Promise-at-the-Orange-Tree-Theatre-review.html
http://entertainment.timesonline.co.uk/tol/arts_and_entertainment/stage/theatre/article7036893.ece
http://www.independent.co.uk/arts-entertainment/theatre-dance/reviews/the-promise-orange-tree-theatre-london-1908299.html
http://www.thestage.co.uk/reviews/review.php/27293/the-promise

2010 plays
Zionism in the United Kingdom
Plays about World War I
Historiography of Israel
Jews and Judaism in fiction
Plays set in England
British plays